Dobrodružství kriminalistiky (Adventure of Criminalistics) is a television series directed by Antonín Moskalyk. It has 26 episodes and was filmed in four seasons over years 1989, 1991, 1992 and 1993.

It is a cycle of stories from different historical periods. In each of the episodes, viewers have the opportunity to look into the beginnings of individual criminology disciplines. The series features real historical figures and almost authentic cases (though modified for the needs of the stories).

The series was filmed in co-production with the German company Schwarzwald Film, Krátký film Praha and the company Gofis, spol. s r. o.

Cast
Boris Rösner as Eugène François Vidocq (episode 1)
Viktor Preiss as lawyer Paillet (episode 2)
Anke Sevenichová as Marie Lafargeová (episode 2)
Ondřej Havelka asúředník Alphonse Bertillon (episode 3)
Petr Kostka as sergeant Joseph Faurot (episode 4 and 20)
Dušan Blaškovič as Lofter (episode 4)
Luděk Munzar as puškař Robert Churchill (episode 5)
Oliver Stritzel as bakteriolog Paul Uhlenhuth (episode 6)
Nelly Gaierová as Klára Grosby (episode 7)
Vlasta Fabianová as Eleonora Rawlisonová (episode 7)
Jiří Adamíra as Gustav Schraepel (episode 7)
Petr Haničinec as Henry Fielding (episode 10)
Karel Heřmánek as Ladislav Havlíček (episode 14)
Eduard Cupák as detective Fasaroli (episode 15)
Andrej Hryc as malíř a Han van Meegeren (episode 16)
Stanislav Zindulka as Max von Stephanitz (episode 19)
Siegfried Lowitz as commissar Benhamou (episode 21)
Jiří Schmitzer as Giulio Canella resp. Mario Bruneri (episode 26)
Despina Pajanou as his wife (episode 26)
Pavol Mikulík as policeman (episode 26)

Episodes

Season 1

External links
Website (in Czech)
IMDb.com

References 

Czech anthology television series
Czech crime television series
German crime television series
1989 television series debuts
1994 television series endings
Czech Television original programming
Czechoslovak television series
Czechoslovak Television original programming